Stephanocora is an unaccepted scientific name and may refer to two genera of corals:
 Echinopora as described by Lamarck, 1816
 Psammocora as described by Dana, 1846